Aldo López Vargas (born 23 May 2000) is a Mexican professional footballer who plays as a midfielder for Liga MX club Santos Laguna.

Career statistics

Club

References

External links
 
 
 

2000 births
Living people
Mexican footballers
Association football midfielders
Atlas F.C. footballers
Liga de Expansión MX players
Liga MX players
Santos Laguna footballers
Tampico Madero F.C. footballers
Footballers from Chihuahua
People from Chihuahua City